Bartlett is a surname. Notable people with the surname include:

Disambiguation of common given names with this surname 
 Edward Bartlett (disambiguation), several people
 Jason Bartlett (disambiguation), several people
 John Bartlett (disambiguation), several people
 Kevin Bartlett (disambiguation), several people
 Neil Bartlett (disambiguation), several people
 Paul Bartlett (disambiguation), several people
 Thomas Bartlett (disambiguation), several people
 William Bartlett (disambiguation), several people

Arts and letters 
 Alicia Giménez Bartlett (born 1951) Spanish writer
 Amanda Bartlett Harris (1824–1917), American author and literary critic
 Annie Latham Bartlett (1865–1948), American sculptor
 Basil Bartlett (1905–1985), British screenwriter
 Bonnie Bartlett (born 1929), American television and film actor
 Charles W. Bartlett (1860–1940), English painter
 Craig Bartlett (born 1956), American animator
 Eugene Monroe Bartlett (1885–1941), American singer, songwriter and music producer
 Ellis Ashmead-Bartlett (1881–1931), British war correspondent during World War I
 Erinn Bartlett (born 1973), American actor
 Ethel Bartlett (1896–1978), British pianist, see Bartlett and Robertson
 Gray Bartlett (born 1942), New Zealand guitarist
Hetta Bartlett (1877–1947), English stage and film actress
 Jennifer Bartlett (born 1941), American artist
Martine Bartlett (1925–2006), American actress
 Mike Bartlett (playwright) (born 1980), English playwright and theatre director
 Murray Bartlett (born 1971), Australian actor
 Paul Wayland Bartlett (1865–1925), American sculptor
 Peter Bartlett (actor) (born 1942), American actor
 Rob Bartlett (born 1957), American comedian and actor
 Ron Bartlett, sound mixer
 Sy Bartlett (1900–1977), American author and screenwriter
 Taurus Bartlett (born 1999), American rapper and singer known professionally as Polo G
 Vernon Bartlett (1894–1983), English journalist and politician

Politics and government 
 Andrew Bartlett (born 1964), senator in the Australian Parliament
 Ann Bartlett (1920–2013), American politician
 Bailey Bartlett (1750–1830), U.S. Representative from Massachusetts
 Bob Bartlett (1904–1968), U.S. Senator from Alaska
 Charles Lafayette Bartlett (1853–1938), U.S. Representative from Georgia
 Charles W. Bartlett (lawyer) (1845–1916), American lawyer and politician
 Dan Bartlett (born 1971), Counselor to the President in the George W. Bush administration
 David Bartlett (born 1968), premier of Tasmania, Australia
 Dewey F. Bartlett (1919–1979), Oklahoma politician
 Dewey F. Bartlett Jr. (born 1947), Oklahoma politician
 Eben Bartlett (1912–1983), New Hampshire state representative
 Ellis Ashmead-Bartlett (politician) (1849–1902), American-born British Conservative politician
 Harry Bartlett (Australian politician) (1835–1915), South Australian parliamentarian
 Joseph J. Bartlett (1834–1893), American Civil War general and diplomat
 Joseph R. Bartlett (born 1969), Maryland politician
 Josiah Bartlett (1729–1795), 6th New Hampshire governor
 Kerry Bartlett (born 1949), Australian politician
 Louis Bartlett (1873–1951), American attorney and mayor
 Manuel Bartlett (born 1936), Mexican politician
 Patricia Bartlett (1928–2000), New Zealand Catholic activist
 Roscoe Bartlett (born 1926), Maryland politician
 Steve Bartlett (born 1947), former U.S. congressman and mayor of Dallas, Texas
 Washington Bartlett (1824–1887), mayor of San Francisco

Sciences 
 Abraham Dee Bartlett (1812–1897), British zoologist
 Albert Allen Bartlett (1923–2013), American professor of physics
 Albert Charles Bartlett, electronics engineer
 Cheryl Bartlett, Canadian biologist 
 Francis A. Bartlett (1882–1963), American arborist
 Frederic Bartlett (1886–1969), British psychologist
 Harley Harris Bartlett (1886–1960), American botanist
 Katharine Bartlett (1907–2001), American physical anthropologist
 M. S. Bartlett (1910–2002), British statistician
 Paul Doughty Bartlett (1907–1997), American chemist
 Rodney J. Bartlett (born 1944), American professor of chemistry and physics

Sports 
 Adam Bartlett (born 1986), English footballer
 Don Bartlett (born 1960), Canadian curler
 Earl Bartlett (1908–1987), American football player
 Fred Bartlett (1913–1968), English footballer
 Gary Bartlett (born 1941), New Zealand cricketer
 Hugh Bartlett (1914–1988), English cricketer
 Megan Bartlett (born 1983), American softball coach
 Mike Bartlett (ice hockey) (born 1985), American ice hockey player
 Nicholas Bartlett (born 1979), Australian kendo player
 Shaun Bartlett (born 1972), South African footballer

Other 
 Bruce Bartlett (born 1951), American historian
 Dana W. Bartlett (1860–??), American Congregationalist minister
 Kristine Bartlett, equal pay campaigner from New Zealand
 Robert Bartlett (explorer) (1875–1946), Newfoundland captain and Arctic explorer
 Robert Bartlett (historian) (born 1950), British historian and medievalist
 Samuel Colcord Bartlett, president of Dartmouth College
 Samuel Slater Bartlett (1899–1969), founder and first headmaster of South Kent School 
 Willard Bartlett (1848–1925), Chief Judge of the New York Court of Appeals
 Taurus Tremani Bartlett (born 1999), American rapper

See also
Bartlett Marshall Low (1839-1893), American businessman and politician
Bartlet

References 

English-language surnames
Patronymic surnames